Roxalana is an unincorporated community in Roane County, West Virginia, United States.

The community was named after Roxalana Smith, the wife of the original owner of the town site.

References 

Unincorporated communities in West Virginia
Unincorporated communities in Roane County, West Virginia